Songs from Before is the third solo album by neo-classical composer Max Richter, released on October 23, 2006 on 130701, an imprint of FatCat Records.

The album was reissued on April 25, 2014 on Deutsche Grammophon.

Critical reception

Songs from Before received largely positive reviews from contemporary music critics.

Pitchfork gave the album a positive review, stating, "Richter takes techniques from the classics and modifies their approach to make more appropriate—but no less efficacious—statements for his own circumstances. Given Songs from Before'''s thematic conceit, this is appropriate: Richter isn't interested in changing the way the world hears his music as much as idealizing how he wants to hear it. He resurrects past idols for present idioms, his heroes, proclivities and experiences donned as unrepentantly as the nostalgia at Songs' core."

Track listing

The album features readings from a number of novels by Haruki Murakami, all read by Robert Wyatt.
 Dance Dance Dance (track 2, Flowers For Yulia)
 Norwegian Wood (track 4, Harmonium)
 South of the Border, West of the Sun (track 7, Time Passing, and track 9, Lullaby)
 Sputnik Sweetheart (track 11, Verses'')

Personnel 
Musicians
 Max Richter – piano
 Chris Worsey – cello
 Natalia Bonner – violin
 Ian Burdge – cello
 Robert Wyatt – readings

Production
 Max Richter – producer, mixing
 Mark Rankin, Anna Tjan – engineer
 Nic Shonfeld – photography

Release history

References

2006 albums
Max Richter albums
FatCat Records albums